The 2014 Pocono 400 was a NASCAR Sprint Cup Series stock car race held on June 8, 2014, at Pocono Raceway in Long Pond, Pennsylvania. Contested over 160 laps on the  triangular superspeedway, it was the 14th race of the 2014 NASCAR Sprint Cup Series. Dale Earnhardt Jr. won the race, his second of the season and his first at Pocono. Brad Keselowski finished second, while Kurt Busch, Denny Hamlin, and Kyle Larson (who placed as the highest finishing rookie) rounded out the Top 5. Behind Larson, the other top rookies in the race were Austin Dillon (17th) and Michael Annett (20th).

Earnhardt Jr. was the fourth straight different driver from Hendrick Motorsports to win at Pocono, following Jeff Gordon's rain-shortened win in August 2012 and Jimmie Johnson and Kasey Kahne in the June and August 2013 (respectively) races.

Previous week's race
Jimmie Johnson held off a four-lap charge by Brad Keselowski to win the FedEx 400 at Dover International Speedway. It was Johnson's second straight win after his Coca-Cola 600 victory the week before; he joined Kevin Harvick and Joey Logano as the only multiple race winners of the season. He led 272 of 400 laps in a performance he described as "incredible", with an "awesome" race car.

Report

Background

The track's turns are banked differently; the first is banked at 14°, the second turn at 8° and the final turn with 6°. However, each of the three straightaways are banked at 2°. The front stretch at Pocono Raceway is 3,740 feet long, the longest at the track. The back stretch, is 3,055 feet long, while the short stretch, which connects turn two with turn three, is only 1,780 feet long. Jimmie Johnson was the defending race winner after winning the race in 2013.

Entry list
The entry list for the Pocono 400 was released on Tuesday, June 3, 2014 at 11:09 a.m. Eastern time. Forty-three drivers were entered for the race which meant no one failed to make the race.

Practice

First practice

Qualifying

"It's a tough balance, but we really just made the car a lot better," Hamlin said. "Each session our balance got a little bit better and we were able to get a little bit more speed out of it. That's kind of what you want to do, play it enough in the first few rounds to get to the final round where you go all out. Good job by our FedEx Ground Toyota team. We didn't test up here, we're one of the only teams that didn't test, but it's good to at least have a good Friday."

Qualifying results

Practice (post-qualifying)

Second practice

Final practice
Aric Almirola had to change his transmission after fluid started leaking out of it with 15 minutes left in practice. It was initially thought that he lost an engine.

Race

First half

Start
Denny Hamlin led the field to the green flag at 1:20 p.m. but Brad Keselowski took the lead from him to lead lap one. The first caution of the day came out at lap 32 for a fire in the inside wall in turn 3. The fire apparently was in the area where pyrotechnics were launched during the pre-race ceremonies. After getting into the rear of Jamie McMurray and damaging the front of the car on the ensuing restart, points leader Matt Kenseth wound up going a lap down on lap 50. Keselowski led the first 56 laps until he came in to pit and Jeff Gordon took the lead for one lap before handing it to Tony Stewart.

The second caution of the race came out on lap 60 for debris in turn three in the middle of green flag stops. Debris on the back stretch, from J. J. Yeley's car, brought out the third caution of the race on lap 72. Stewart took the lead from Keselowski on the restart. A spin in turn 1 by Dave Blaney brought out the fourth caution on lap 80. Kurt Busch took the lead from Stewart on lap 84, before Stewart regained the lead from Busch five laps later. Rookie Kyle Larson led his first ever lap in Sprint Cup competition on lap 102, before Jimmie Johnson found his way to the lead for the first time at lap 109; he pitted not long after, ceding the lead to another rookie, Michael Annett.

Second half
Stewart re-took the lead on lap 112 after the green flag stops cycled through, while team-mate Kevin Harvick had a flat tire four laps later. The fifth caution of the race came out on lap 118 for fluid on the race track. Stewart was too fast entering pit road and had to serve a drive-through penalty, handing the lead to Keselowski. Justin Allgaier led his first ever lap on lap 134, before Danica Patrick brought out the sixth caution, by crashing at turn three. The seventh caution of the race came out with 18 laps to go. Kasey Kahne, Kyle Busch, Carl Edwards and Greg Biffle were involved.

Finish
Dale Earnhardt Jr. took the lead from Brad Keselowski with five laps to go and took the checkered flag. He inherited the lead after Keselowski dropped back to try to remove the piece of trash on his grill. "That's unfortunate for him," Earnhardt said. "He had me beat. I couldn't get to him. It's real hard to pass here. I've lost some in strange ways. It feels good to win one like that. Brad definitely had the better car. I'll own up to that, but we won the race." Keselowski stated that his car "was running really hot" and that he thought it "was going to blow up".

Race results

Race statistics
 Lead changes: 21 among different drivers
 Cautions/Laps: 7 for 26        
 Red flags: 0                                  
 Time of race: 2 hours, 52 minutes and 7 seconds
 Average speed: 
 Dale Earnhardt Jr. took home $198.965 in winnings

Media

Television

Radio

Standings after the race

Drivers' Championship standings

Manufacturers' Championship standings

Note: Only the first sixteen positions are included for the driver standings.

References

Pocono 400
Pocono 400
Pocono 400
NASCAR races at Pocono Raceway